Honey Creek is a stream in Henry and Johnson counties of Missouri. It is a tributary of Big Creek.

Honey Creek was named for the honey bees near its course.

See also
List of rivers of Missouri

References

Rivers of Henry County, Missouri
Rivers of Johnson County, Missouri
Rivers of Missouri